Aleksandar Tanasin (born 15 November 1991) is a Serbian football defender who plays for Proleter Novi Sad.

Club career

Metalac Futog
Born in Novi Sad, Tanasin is a product of Vojvodina's youth school. He was loaned to Metalac Futog for 2009–10 season. He made 24 league appearances and scored 4 goals in Serbian League Vojvodina.

Cement Beočin
After successful season in Futog, Tanasin moved to Cement Beočin. He made 27 Serbian League Vojvodina caps and scored 1 goal for the 2010–11 Serbian League Vojvodina season.

Proleter Novi Sad
Tanasin joined Proleter Novi Sad in 2011–12 season. During four seasons playing for Proleter, mostly as a first choice in the right-back position, he collected 106 first league appearances, and scored 3 goals. He made 4 cup caps, too. Although he is a defender, he also played as a winger in some matches. He was the captain in some matches.

Borac Čačak
In summer 2015, Tanasin moved to Serbian SuperLiga club Borac Čačak, under coach Nenad Lalatović, who knows him from the time when he led Proleter. Tanasin made his SuperLiga debut for Borac Čačak in the 1st fixture, against Radnički Niš on 17 July 2015. Playing for Borac, Tanasin made over 50 SuperLiga caps and also noted several cup matches between 2015 and 2016. At the beginning of 2017, Tanasin left the club as a free agent after the end of contract.

Career statistics

References

External links
 Aleksandar Tanasin stats at utakmica.rs 
 
 

1991 births
Living people
Footballers from Novi Sad
Association football defenders
Serbian footballers
FK Proleter Novi Sad players
FK Cement Beočin players
FK Borac Čačak players
Serbian First League players
Serbian SuperLiga players